HZA may refer to:

 Horizon Airlines (Australia), ICAO code HZA
 Heze Mudan Airport, IATA code HZA
 Hogere Zeevaartschool Amsterdam, professional education for maritime officers at the Hogeschool van Amsterdam
 , German for "Central Customs Office"